False Bay (Afrikaans: Valsbaai) is a body of water in the Atlantic Ocean between the mountainous Cape Peninsula and the Hottentots Holland Mountains in the extreme south-west of South Africa. The mouth of the bay faces south and is demarcated by Cape Point to the west and Cape Hangklip to the east. The north side of the bay is the low-lying Cape Flats, and the east side is the foot of the Hottentots Holland Mountains to Cape Hangklip which is at nearly the same latitude as Cape Point. In plan the bay is approximately square, being roughly the same extent from north to south as east to west, with the southern side open to the ocean. The seabed slopes gradually down from north to south, and is mostly fairly flat unconsolidated sediments. Much of the bay is off the coast of the City of Cape Town, and it includes part of the Table Mountain National Park Marine Protected Area and the whole of the Helderberg Marine Protected Area. The name "False Bay" was applied at least three hundred years ago by sailors returning from the east who confused Cape Point and Cape Hangklip, which are somewhat similar in form.

False Bay is at the extreme western end of the inshore Agulhas marine ecoregion which extends from Cape Point to the Mbashe river over the continental shelf, in the overlap zone between Cape Agulhas and Cape Point where the warm Agulhas Current and the cooler South Atlantic waters mix. The continental shelf is at its widest in this ecoregion, extending up to 240 km offshore on the Agulhas Bank, but is considerably narrower off False Bay. This ecoregion has the highest number of South African marine endemics, and is a breeding area for many species. The transition between the Agulhas ecoregion and the cooler Benguela ecoregion is at Cape Point, on the western boundary of False Bay.

False Bay also contains South Africa's largest naval base at Simon's Town (historically a base for the Royal Navy),  and small fishing harbours at Kalk Bay and Gordon's Bay.

Description and location 

The western side is bordered by the Cape Peninsula, and this stretch of coastline includes the smaller Smitswinkel Bay, Simon's Bay and Fish Hoek Bay. At Muizenberg the coastline becomes relatively low and sandy and curves east across the southern boundary of the Cape Flats to Gordon's Bay to form the northern boundary of False Bay. From Gordon's Bay the coastline swings roughly south, and zig-zags its way along the foot of the Hottentots Holland Mountains to Cape Hangklip which is at nearly the same latitude as Cape Point. The highest peak on this side is Kogelberg at 1,269 m.

In plan the bay is approximately square with rather wobbly edges, being roughly the same extent from north to south as east to west (30 km), with the entire southern side open to the ocean. The area of False Bay has been measured at about 1,090 km2, and the volume is approximately 45 km3 (average depth about 40 m). The land perimeter has been measured at 116 km, from a 1:50,000 scale map.

The eastern and western shores of the bay are very rocky and even mountainous; in places large cliffs plunge into the water. Notable peaks associated with the bay include Koeëlberg, which rises from the water itself forming the highest point of the Kogelberg, as well as Somerset Sneeukop (1590m / 5217 feet) and Wemmershoek Peak which are clearly visible across the bay. Some of the highest peaks visible across False Bay include Du Toits Peak near Paarl, Klein Winterhoek Peak near Tulbagh, Mostertshoek Peak at the Western extreme of the Michell's Pass and Groot Winterhoek Peak North of Tulbagh. The northern shore, however, is defined by a very long, curving, sandy beach. This sandy, northern perimeter of the bay is the southern edge of the area known as the Cape Flats. The bay is 30 km wide at its widest point.

Suburbs of Cape Town stretch right across the Cape Flats from Simon's Town halfway down the Cape Peninsula to the north-eastern corner at Gordon's Bay. There are also two small towns of the Overberg region on the east coast of the bay, Rooi-Els and Pringle Bay.

Coastal landmarks 
Coastal landmarks visible from offshore in False Bay, listed clockwise from Cape Point to Cape Hangklip:

Cape Point, the south-westernmost point of the bay, marked by the current lighthouse and the original lighthouse,
Vasco da Gama Peak (266m), the highest point nearest the mouth of the bay on the Cape Peninsula,
Rooikrans, A cliff area with a small sea cave,
Matrooskop (109m), a small local peak inshore of Buffels Bay,
Buffels Bay, a small bay on the west side of False Bay, with a small craft slipway,
Bordjiesrif, a small, low sandstone promontory on the north side of Buffels Bay,
Paulsberg (369m), 
Judas Peak (319m), the peak above the cliffs to the immediate south of Smitswinkel Bay,
Batsata Rock, an exposed inshore granite rock below Judas Peak near the northern boundary of the Paulsberg restricted zone, and the southern limit of Smitswinkel Bay,
Smitswinkel Bay, a small bay on the west side of False Bay, with a few coastal houses,
Baboon Rock, a landmark indicating the southern extent of the Castle Rock restricted area,
Partridge Point, a granite corestone promontory with several large exposed inshore rocks extending about a hundred metres into the bay on the north side of Smitswinkel Bay,  
Finlay's Point, a smaller granite corestone promontory north of Partridge Point,
Castle Rocks, a larger granite corestone promontory, comprising a massive and fairly high outcrop at the end of a small, low isthmus, with several large inshore exposed rocks south of Miller's Point, 
Bakoven Rock, an exposed inshore granite rock between Castle Rocks and Miller's Point, near the northern extent of the Castle Rocks restricted area,
Rumbly Bay, a small cove with a small craft slipway on the south side of Miller's Point,
Millers Point, a fairly large but low granite corestone promontory, with a small craft slipway on the northwest side, and several exposed and drying rocks extending to seaward,
Spaniard Rock, an inshore exposed granite rock off Rocklands Point,
Rocklands Point, a minor granite promontory north of Miller's Point,
Swartkop (679m), the highest point on the Southern Peninsula,
Simonsberg (548m), the peak above Simon's Town,
Oatlands Point, a minor granite promontory with a large inshore exposed rock and a shoreline navigation beacon,
Fishermans Beach, a short, sandy beach north of Oatlands Point,
Froggy Pond, a small cove with a small sandy beach north of Fishermans Beach separated by a low rocky promontory,
Windmill Beach, a small sandy beach partly enclosed by massive granite boulders, with two small coves,
Noah's Ark rock, a conspicuous inshore exposed rock at the mouth of Simon's Bay,
Simon's Bay, the largest bay on the west side of False Bay, very well protected from the prevailing south westerly swell, but fairly exposed to wind and waves from the south-east,
Boulders Beach, Seaforth, a sandy beach between large scattered granite boulders,
Simon's Town Naval Base harbour, a man-made harbour with breakwater and sea-walls enclosing the naval dockyard,
False Bay Yacht Club moorings, a floating marina protected from the south-easterly wind and waves by the naval harbour, with somewhat less protected open moorings further into the bay,
Long Beach, a sandy beach on the west side of Simon's Bay, usually in the lee of the harbour for south easterly winds,
Roman Rock, an exposed rock in Simon's Bay with a lighthouse on it,
Mackerel Bay, a small sandy beach north of Simon's Town,
Glencairn, a small residential suburb in a valley north of Simon's Town, with a beach in Elsebaai,
Elsebaai, a small bay in the north part of Simon's Bay,
Glencairn quarry, a conspicuous excavation in the side of Else Peak,
Else Peak (303m), a small peak between Simon's Town and Fish Hoek,
Fish Hoek bay, the northernmost minor bay of the west side of False Bay with a sandy beach open to the sea,
Sunny Cove, the rocky sandstone coastline on the south side of Fish Hoek bay,
Fish Hoek beach, a sandy beach on the east side of the Fish Hoek–Noordhoek gap, a low-lying break in the mountain range of the peninsula between False Bay and the Atlantic coast.
 Trappieskop, the hill above Kalk Bay,
Kalk Bay harbour, a small commercial fishing harbour in Kalk bay, completely enclosing the tiny sandy beach,
St James, the suburb to the north of Kalk Bay,
Kalkbaaiberg (517m), the peak above Kalk Bay
Muizenberg (509m), the peak to the west of Muizenberg suburb, and the northernmost peak directly overlooking the west side of False Bay,
Muizenberg beach (Sunrise Beach), -->, a long sandy beach along the low-lying northwestern coast of False Bay,
Kapteinsklip, a low rocky promontory between Muizenberg and Strandfontein beaches,
Strandfontein, 
Wolfgat Nature Reserve, a small coastal nature reserve on the north coast of the bay,
Swartklip, 
Monwabisi, a resort area on the north coast of the bay,
Macassar Beach, a long stretch of sand beach on the north coast of the bay,
Eerste River mouth, the mouth of the largest river crossing th Cape Flats,
Helderberg Marine Protected Area, a small coastal marine protected area between the mouths of the Eerste and Lourens rivers,
Lourens River mouth, the mouth of the river flowing through Somerset West and Strand,
Strand Beach, a sandy shoreline along the coast of the suburb, becoming rocky to the east,
Harbour Island marina, a small craft harbour development on the north-eastern coast of the bay,
Gordon's Bay beach, a small sandy beach in the north-eastern corner of the bay,
 Gordon's Bay Harbour, a small fishing harbour and marina,
Steenbras River mouth, mouth of a river with catchment to the east of the Hottentots Holland range,
Boskloof Peak (648m), mountain peak south of the Steenbras River mouth,
Boskloof Point, promontory south of the Steenbras River mouth,
Kogelbaai, a fairly long sandy beach on the east coast of the bay,
Kogelberg, a mountain peak above Kogelbaai,
Rooielsberg (638m), a peak above the point to the north of Rooi-Els,
Rooi-Els River mouth, the mouth of the Rooi-Els river at a small sandy beach in Rooi-Els bay,
The Point (Rooi-Els), 
Klein Hangklip (309m), a small peak overlooking Rooi-Els,
Rooi-Els, a small coastal residential area in the Overberg district,
Pringle Bay, A small, shallow bay on the south-east side of False Bay, which has a small sandy beach on the east and a rocky coastline to the south, with a small residential town along the shore,
Buffels River mouth, the mouth of a small river, draining into Pringle Bay,
Die Punt (Pringle Bay), The point to the south of Pringle Bay,
Pringle Peak (159m), Peak at Pringle Bay,
Hangklip (455m), peak at the south eastern extreme of False Bay, with near vertical profile on the south side,
Cape Hangklip, a low promontory extending southwards below Hangklip Peak,

Bottom morphology 
The bottom morphology of False Bay is generally smooth and fairly shallow, sloping gently downwards at about 3 m per km from north to south, so that the depth at the centre of the mouth is about 80 m. The bottom is covered with sediment which ranges from very coarse to very fine, with most of the fine sediment and mud in the centre of the bay. The main exception is a long ridge of sedimentary rock that extends in a southward direction from off the Strand, to approximately level with the mouth of the Steenbras River. The southern tip of this ridge is known as Steenbras Deep.

There is one true island in the bay, Seal Island, a barren and stony outcrop of granite about 200 m long and with an area of about 2 ha. It is about 6 km south of Strandfontein and is less than 10 m above sea level at its highest point. There are also a number of small rocky islets which extend above the high water mark, and other rocks and shoals which approach the surface. The largest of these, and the most significant navigational hazard in the bay, is Whittle Rock, a large outcrop of granite about halfway into the bay and a quarter of the way across from the Cape Peninsula, which is about a kilometre in diameter and rises from a fairly flat sand bottom at about 40 m to within 4 m of the surface. Most of these reefs on the western side of the bay are granite of the Peninsula pluton, but east of Seal Island they are generally sandstone, either of the Table Mountain series, or of the underlying Tygerberg formation. Whittle Rock reef can refract large south easterly storm waves, increasing their size in the vicinity of Kalk Bay harbour.

Other shoal areas include the granite reefs at Roman Rock in Simon's Bay, hard sedimentary or metamorphic rock at York shoal and hard sandstone at East shoal, and several isolated granite outcrops which are too deep to be navigational hazards in the western part of the bay. The palaeo-drainage of the bay is split between the western side of the bay and the eastern side by the more durable contact zone between the Peninsula granite and the Tygerberg sediments, with deep valleys cut into the bedrock during the glacial maximum, leaving the bay on opposite sides of Rocky Bank, which have since been filled with sediments. The drainage of the west side passed to the west of Seal Island, Whittle Rock and Rocky bank. The east side was drained by a valley between Seal Island and East Shoal, and another valley to the east of Steenbras Ridge, which joined east of Rocky bank.

Outside the bay, but influencing the wave patterns in it, is Rocky Bank, an extensive area of relatively flat sandstone reef between 20 and 30 m depth on the top, sloping down on all sides, but mostly to the south and east, where the depth can exceed 100 m. A long underwater sandstone ridge sweeps across the eastern side of the mouth from Cape Hangklip towards the southwest, that is believed to affect water circulation in the bay. On the west side, a relatively shallow area of granite reef extends beyond the Cape Peninsula, with one major navigational hazard at Bellows Rock and a lesser one somewhat closer inshore at Anvil Rock.

Bathymetry

The bathymetry of False Bay differs in character from the west side of the Cape Peninsula. The west coast seabed tends to slope down more steeply than in False Bay, and although the close inshore waters are also shallow, the 100 m contour is mostly within about 10 km of the west coast, while the entire False Bay is shallower than about 90 m. The bottom of the bay slopes down relatively gradually from the gently sloping beaches of the north shore to the mouth, and has a fairly even depth from east to west except close to the shorelines, with three major features disrupting this gentle slope. These are Seal Island, Whittle Rock, and the Steenbras ridge. Just outside the bay, there is a large shoal area at Rocky Bank, and a large ridge extending south-west from Cape Hangklip, which channels cold, nutrient-rich water into the west side of the bay during upwelling events.

Geology

The three main rock formations are the late-Precambrian Malmesbury Group (sedimentary and metamorphic rock), the Peninsula granite, a huge batholith that was intruded into the Malmesbury Group about 630 million years ago, and the Table Mountain group sandstones that were deposited on the eroded peneplain surface of the granite and Malmesbury series basement about 450 million years ago. The sand, silt and mud deposits were lithified by pressure and then folded during the Permian–Triassic Cape Orogeny to form the Cape Fold Belt, which extends along the western and southern coasts of the Western Cape. The present landscape is due to prolonged erosion having carved out deep valleys, removing parts of the once continuous Table Mountain group sandstone cover from the Cape Flats and leaving high residual mountain ridges.

At times the sea covered the Cape Flats and Noordhoek valley and the Cape Peninsula was then a group of islands, and False Bay and the Cape Flats a strait. During glacial periods the sea level dropped to expose the bottom of False Bay to weathering and erosion, the last major regression leaving the entire bottom of False Bay exposed. During this period an extensive system of dunes was formed on the sandy floor of False Bay.  At this time the drainage outlets lay between Rocky Bank and Cape Point to the west, and between Rocky Bank and Hangklip Ridge to the east.

Waves, tides, water circulation and temperature

Swell entering the bay is predominantly the product of the westerly winds blowing over the Southern Ocean. The prevailing swell is about 12 to 25 second period from the southwest with average height of about 3 m. It impinges directly on the east coast of the bay, amplified by refraction over Rocky Bank in the region near the Steenbras River mouth, where rogue waves may occur. Further west the swell refracts and diffuses around a fairly large shoal area around Cape Point, and is moderately to severely attenuated by the time it reaches the western shores.

Waves along the north coast of the bay between Macassar and Muizenberg generally break by spilling as the slope is shallow. In summer, strong south-easterly winds blow over a fetch partly limited by the width of the bay and generate short period wind waves of around 6 seconds and 2 m height, and produce multiple lines of breakers along the north shore. Where the slopes are steeper rip currents may occur which are a hazard to swimmers.

Northward propagating long period waves are focused in the northeast and northwest parts of False Bay by refraction effects over the shoal waters of Rocky Bank in the mouth of the bay, with measured heights of waves in the area between Steenbras mouth and Kogelbaai being up to twice the height of the waves in the Muizenberg to Strandfontein region for the prevailing southwesterly open ocean swell. The focusing effect is mostly on swells with a period of 13 seconds or more, and a direction between 210° and 245° true. The smaller and shallower reef at Whittle Rock towards the west side of the bay has a similar but lesser effect, and can focus longer period south-easterly waves on Kalk Bay. This is unusual and associated with a cut-off low pressure system causing the south-easterly winds to blow for an unusually long time over enough fetch to develop a sea sufficiently for it to be refracted by the shoal area. Wave height of southwesterly swells decreases from west to east along the north coast of False Bay due to the effects of refraction and friction of the wave base on larger areas of offshore reef before reaching the shoreline.

Tides are regular, semi-diurnal, and relatively weak, and there are no strong tidal currents. Maximum tidal range at Simon's Town is 2.0 m at highest astronomical tide, with minimum range of about 0.56 m at mean neap tides. When large waves break at Macassar on a high tide the beach is known to be dangerous for swimming and beach erosion is increased.

The circulation patterns of False Bay are variable over time, with seasonal and longer term cycles. There are cold-water upwelling events associated with south-easterly winds in summer, and periodic intrusions of warm water eddies from the Agulhas Current of the south coast, both of which contribute to the biodiversity.

Four main surface circulation patterns have been observed in False Bay. Wind is the dominant forcing influence on surface circulation, with tidal and inertial currents of secondary importance, mainly when the winds are weak. Gordon's Bay is in the wind shadow of the Hottentots-Holland Mountains for south easterly winds, and this causes a semi-permanent anticyclonic eddy and associated anticlockwise gyre, in the opposite direction to the usual cyclonic circulation of the main part of the bay.

A clockwise rotation driven by the south-easterly winds mostly occurs during summer. This circulation is partly set up by west-north-westerly flow south of the bay splitting at Cape Point. The northerly component sets up flow towards the equator on the western shores. South-easterly winds cause this clockwise pattern to dominate. North-westerly winds cause an anti-clockwise circulation, with an eastward current flowing south of the Bay and entering at Cape Hangklip. When there is no strong wind forcing, tidal forcing can occur on the incoming and outgoing tides. A fairly uniform northward flow occurs during flooding tides, and southward during ebbing tides, with bathymetry affecting the flow direction in shallow areas. These currents are most noticeable along the coastline and in the shallow northern parts of the bay between Simon's Town and Gordon's Bay.

In the deeper areas of the mouth of the bay, tidal and inertial currents appear to contribute to the variability of the deeper part of the water column, along with the effects of wind forcing. Wave energy focused by the various shoal areas outside and inside the bay is a driver of nearshore currents, particularly in the northern parts of the bay.

In summer False Bay is thermally stratified, with a vertical temperature variation of 5 to 9˚C between the warmer surface water and cooler depths below 50 m, while in winter the water column is at nearly constant temperature at all depths. The development of a thermocline is strongest around late December and peaks in late summer to early autumn. In summer the south easterly winds generate a zone of upwelling near Cape Hangklip, where surface water temperatures can be 6 to 7 °C colder than the surrounding areas, and bottom temperatures below 12 °C.

In the summer to early autumn (January–March), cold water upwelling near Cape Hangklip causes a strong surface temperature gradient between the south-western and north-eastern corners of the bay. In winter the surface temperature tends to be much the same everywhere. In the northern sector surface temperature varies a bit more (13 to 22 °C) than in the south (14 to 20 °C) during the year.

Surface temperature variation from year to year is linked to the El Niño–Southern Oscillation. During El Niño years the South Atlantic high is shifted, reducing the south-easterly winds, so upwelling and evaporative cooling are reduced and sea surface temperatures throughout the bay are warmer, while in La Niña years there is more wind and upwelling and consequently lower temperatures. Surface water heating during El Niño increases vertical stratification. The relationship is not linear.

Water density dynamics are mostly temperature dependent, with only weak influences from salinity. The major influence on temperature distribution is wind driven upwelling and advection of cold water, which is most notable north-west of Hangklip, and less marked near Gordon's Bay, due to strong south-easterly winds, with insolation as a secondary effect, mostly in the shallow waters of the northern and north-easterly regions. Waves may have more influence on nearshore temperature than wind. Upwelling outside the bay along the coast east of Hangklip can also supply cold water to the bay

Rivers and drainage

Drainage into False Bay can be considered from four watersheds: The east-flowing streams of the southern Cape Peninsula, the Cape Flats, the Helderberg basin, and the south-westwards drainage of the Hottentots-Holland mountains of the Overberg, extending south as far as Cape Hamgklip.

The eastward draining rivers of the Southern Peninsula are generally fairly short and steep, and some, such as the Silvermine and Elsje rivers, have valley bottom wetlands at the coast. The Buffels River flows from a small spring to its mouth in Buffels Bay, the Klawersvlei River flows northwest from behind the mountains above Miller's Point over the plateau behind Simon's Town, before turning east over the escarpment and a high waterfall, entering the bay near the Simon's Town railway station, the Elsjes River flows from the Red Hill plateau to enter False Bay from the Glencairn valley, and the Silvermine River, originally known as the Esselstein Rivier, drains the valley south of the Steenberg mountains and flows east across the Steenberg Plateau, then south through the Silvermine Valley before crossing the coastal Fish Hoek plain to enter False Bay at Clovelly on the north side of Fish Hoek Bay. Between these short and fairly steep streams, rainwater runoff generally flows directly down the mountainside into the bay.

The Sandvlei catchment drains the east side of the mountains north of Muizenberg and south of the Liesbeek catcment into False Bay: Sandvlei (Zandvlei) is the largest of eight estuaries on the False Bay coastline, with an area of about 155 hectares. It is fed by the Westlake, Keysers and Sand rivers. The Diep River flows from the mountains above Constantia to Little Princessvlei, which is drained by the Sand River, which flows into the northeast of Sandvlei. The Westlake River, also known as the Steenberg or Raapkraal River, originates on the slopes of the Steenberg and flows through the Kirstenhof wetlands into the north west of Sandvlei, and the Keysers River and its tributaris, the Grootbosch, Spaanschemat and Prinseskasteel rivers rise on Constantiaberg. The upper reaches of the Spaanschemat River are known as the Glen Alpine Stream, which originates below  Constantia Nek and is joined by the Eagles Nest Stream.

Historically the Cape Flats was partly covered in wetlands, particularly during winter, and retained much of its rainfall. Many of these wetlands have been destroyed by canalisation and infilling to provide residential space. Many of the remaining perennial vleis are at the southwest side of the region. (Zeekoevlei, Rondevlei, Zandvlei etc.) and drain into the bay at Muizenberg through the estuary at Zandvlei. There is also groundwater seepage through the sand along the north coast of the bay.
The Elsieskraal River and the Black River catchment drain to the northwest into Table Bay, and do not affect False Bay.  The Diep River catchment drains into Zandvlei, and Zeekoevlei and its catchment also drain to Zandvlei at times. 

The Eerste River and its tributary the Kuils River, drain into False Bay on the north coast, west of the Helderberg basin watershed. They drain part of the Cape Flats, but most of the catchment of the Eerste River is in the Stellenbosch district, between the Helderberg and Stellenbosch Mountains, and the Jonkershoek Valley.

The catchment of the Lourens River is in the Helderberg region. It is the largest river of the region. The source is in Diepgat Ravine, in the Hottentots Holland Mountains. It is joined by minor tributaries from Landdroskloof and Sneeukopkloof in its upper reaches, The river flows in a south-westerly direction between the Helderberg and Schapenberg through Somerset West and Strand to a small estuary on the coast of False Bay. Its overall length is about 20 kilometres.

The Soete River is a small river that may have originally been part of the Lourens River system, diverting floodwater through an alternative route to the bay.

Sir Lowry's River drains the south side of Schapenberg and west side of the Hottentots Holland south of Schapenberg. It enters the bay in Gordon's Bay.
 
The Steenbras River catchment is to the east of the Hottentots Holland mountains, and almost all of its water is retained by the upper and lower Steenbras Dams, which are a significant part of the municipal water supply to the City of Cape Town. Steenbras River mouth is south of Gordon's Bay. 

The Rooiels River enters False Bay at Rooiels beach. It drains a small catchment area in a nature reserve in the mountains of the southwest of the Overberg district.

Water quality 

The nutrient contribution to False Bay surface waters by upwelling appears to be greater than that of terrestrial sources by runoff and groundwater seepage, but pollutants from terrestrial sources can be persistent and can have adverse effects on coastal ecosystems and recreational activities. Mixing with offshore water has a significant effect on surf zone and inshore water quality, but the effects of microbial processes on inshore water quality and the relative contribution of anthropogenic sources of nutrients remains unknown, but likely to be increasing.

History 

In pre-colonial times False Bay along with most of the Southern African coast provided sustenance to the Khoisan or Khoekhoen tribe who collected seafood from the shores and deposited the shells in middens along the coast which indicate usage over some 10 000 years. Bartolomeu Dias in 1488 first referred to the bay as "the gulf between the mountains". The name "False Bay" was applied early on (at least three hundred years ago) by sailors who confused the bay with Table Bay to the north. According to Schirmer, the confusion arose because sailors returning from the east (The Dutch East Indies) initially confused Cape Point and Cape Hangklip, which are somewhat similar in form. Hangklip was known to the early Portuguese seafarers as Cabo Falso, or False Cape, and the name of the bay derived from the cape. Commercial fishing was started in the late 17th century soon after settlement by the Dutch.

In 1672 the Dutch warship Goudvinck was stationed at the Cape and was instructed to survey False Bay, but it is not known how much was done before they were recalled. Simon van der Stel, appointed commander of the station in 1679, sailed False Bay in November 1687 on the ship De Noord, took the earliest recorded soundings, and described the islands, reefs and shoreline of the bay. By the end of the 17th century the general bathymetry was known.

The Whittle Rock reef is named after a lieutenant Whittle of the Royal Navy, who surveyed parts of False Bay after HMS Indent was damaged off Miller's Point soon after the first British occupation of the Cape in 1795.

Commercial fishing has been practiced in False Bay since the late 1600s. Over time a range of fishing methods have been prohibited in False Bay. Demersal trawling, purse seining and gillnetting were introduced in the 19th century, but have been stopped as they were depleting stocks, conflicting with other fisheries and users, and damaging the environment. Illegal gillnetting is still a problem.

Penguin eggs were collected until 1968, whaling operations took place until 1975, seals were hunted for fur until 1984, and guano was collected until 1991. All of these activities had a severely detrimental effect on the targeted populations and are now illegal. Commercial abalone diving has been severely restricted as the resource was overfished but illegal exploitation of the resource continues. Recreational abalone extraction has been discontinued.

There have been symposia, in 1968 and 1989, on the socio-ecological importance of False Bay, with reviews of the oceanography and biology of the bay and human impact on it.

Shipwrecks 
Over the years, a number of ships have been wrecked in False Bay, due to weather, war, errors in navigation, other accidents, or intentional scuttling. These include:

Shipwrecks:
 Ship Robert, sprang a leak and was beached without loss of life near Gordon's Bay on 12 February 1847. (Cape of Good Hope Almanac, 1852, p105)
 Dutch East India schooner Catwyk aan Rhyn, driven ashore in a gale in Simon's Bay without loss of life on 7 October 1786.
 French frigate Penelope 16 October 1788
 Dutch ship Drietal Handelaars 16 May 1789
 Britush turret steamer SS Clan Stuart ran aground at Glencairn, 21 November 1914
 Waterloo wrecked at Fish Hoek on 25 October 1821 
 Cockburn wrecked on Muizenberg beach in 1823
 French whaler Le Protee  wrecked at Strandfontein on 10 January 1839
 Barque Admiral Cockburn wrecked at Muizenberg beach on 27 July 1839
 Schooner Felix Vincidor wrecked at Muizenberg beach on 28 July 1841
 Slaving barque Rowvonia wrecked in Simon's Bay on 13 January 1850
 Dutch warship Bata (HNMS Bato?), burned and sank in Simon's Bay in 1803
 Portuguese warship Sarpine wrecked near Hottentot's Holland in 1691
 Sloop Benjamin lost with all hands at Gordon's Bay on 20 September 1800
 Dutch East Indiaman Hollandia Caught fire and sank in Simon's Bay c.1720
 HMS Trident struck Whittle Rock and sank
 British East Indiaman Euphrates struck Whittle Rock and sank
 Brig Camille wrecked at Muizenberg beach on 18 October 1816
 Benefactress wrecked at Lourens River mouth, The Strand, in November 1870
 Prussian barque Johanna Wagner wrecked at Zandfontein near Muizenberg on 16 July 1862
 Schooner Nukteris (Nuchteris?) wrecked at Buffels Bay just north of Cape Point on 9 August 1897
 Padang (Padarig?) wrecked in Simon's Bay on 29 June 1828
 Parana (Panama?) Wrecked in Simon's Bay on 9 October 1862
 Phoenix wrecked at Phoenix shoal off Boulders Beach, Simon's Town on 19 July 1829
 Frigate Revolutionnaire wrecked in Simon's Bay on 29 July 1816
 Vrouw Ida Alida wrecked at Muizenberg in 1818
 Zebra wrecked in Simon's Bay on 29 July 1816
 Rex wrecked in the vicinity of Fish Hoek in 1903
 British East Indiaman Colebrooke wrecked south of Steenbras River mouth on 25 August 1778
 English East Indiaman Brunswick wrecked at Long Beach in Simon's Bay

Scuttled:
 MV Rockeater scuttled as an artificial reef in Smitswinkel Bay on 15 December 1972
 SAS Pietermaritzburg scuttled as a recreational dive site just north of Millers Point
 SAS Good Hope scuttled as an artificial reef in Smitswinkel Bay
 SAS Fleur scuttled in central False Bay north of Whittle Rock
 SAS Transvaal scuttled as an artificial reef in Smitswinkel Bay
 SAS Bloemfontein scuttled in central False Bay
 MFV Princess Elizabeth scuttled as an artificial reef in Smitswinkel Bay
 MFV Orotava scuttled as an artificial reef in Smitswinkel Bay
 'Muzenberg trawlers' scuttled off Muizenberg
 ST Godetia scuttled as an air-force training exercise off Macassar
 SATS General Botha scuttled in central False Bay east of Whittle Rock by gunfire from a battery at Simon's Town

Climate 

The climate is Mediterranean, with warm, dry summers and cool, damp winters. In winter, gales and storms from the northwest are common and can be ferocious. False Bay is exposed to southeasterly winds in summer and its waters are approximately 6 °C warmer than those of Table Bay, owing to the influence of the warm Agulhas Current. The La Niña phase of the El Niño–Southern Oscillation cycle tends to increase rainfall in this region in the dry season (November to April).

Winds
The winds have a strong influence on the waves and water circulation and through it the sea surface temperature. The wind follows a characteristic pattern, which shifts in latitude with the seasons and follows the Rossby waves as they move eastwards over the southern ocean. A southwesterly wind follows the passage of a cold front as the anticyclone moves east and merges with the South Atlantic High, producing strong south-easterly winds. The high pressure cell moves further over the tip of Africa and splits off the South Atlantic high, with weakening south easterly winds, followed by a coastal low with north-westerly wind before the next cold front, bringing cool, wet westerly wind which passes around Table Mountain and converges as a northerly wind over the bay.

The South Atlantic high shifts latitude with the seasons, following the sun, and this causes a large variation in the wind pattern over the passage of the year. In summer it moves south and the south-easterly winds dominate, and on average are strongest during January and February. During winter the northward shift allows the fronts to extend further north with stronger north-westerly winds and more frequent and heavier rain. The winter winds tend to be strongest in June and are generally northwesterly. The transition periods are April and September.

Local variations in wind direction and strength are caused by interaction with the mountains on both sides of the bay. South-easterly winds are accelerated northwest of Cape Hangklip, and a distinct wind shadow can develop in the lee of the Kogelberg mountain. Northwesterly winds accelerate over Table Mountain and approach the bay from varying directions depending on the local topography. Temperature differences between land and water can also produce diurnal variations of wind speed and direction, particularly in summer.

Ecology and marine life 

False Bay is at the extreme western end of the inshore Agulhas marine ecoregion which extends from Cape Point to the Mbashe River over the continental shelf, in the overlap zone between Cape Agulhas and Cape Point where the warm Agulhas Current and the cooler South Atlantic waters mix. The continental shelf is at its widest in this ecoregion, extending up to 240 km offshore on the Agulhas Bank, but is considerably narrower off False Bay. This ecoregion has the highest number of South African endemics, and is a breeding area for many species. There are several important commercial fisheries in this region. The transition between the Agulhas ecoregion and the cooler Benguela ecoregion is at Cape Point, on the western boundary of False Bay.

There are two marine protected areas in False Bay: The Table Mountain National Park Marine Protected Area (TMNPMPA) lies on both sides of the Cape Peninsula, so is partly in False Bay, and the Helderberg Marine Protected Area is off Macassar on the northern shoreline of the bay.

Habitat types 
The benthic habitat types listed for False Bay in the National Biodiversity Assessment are:

Estuaries 
Estuarine shore
Dissipative sandy coast
Dissipative-intermediate sandy coast
Intermediate sandy coast
Reflective sandy coast
Mixed shore
Boulder shore
Sheltered rocky coast
Exposed rocky coast
Very exposed rocky coast
Sandy inshore 
Sandy inner shelf 
Hard inshore
Hard inner shelf
Hard outer shelf
Reef 
Island buffer zone, and 
Harbour

Fauna 

The marine animals of False Bay are diverse and varied. The more popularly known species which are a tourist draw include white sharks, abalone, African penguins, snoek, yellowtail, and many over-exploited linefish species, west coast rock lobster, and abalone. Besides the resident species and several known migrants, the waters of the MPA are occasionally visited by vagrants carried in by the eddies of the Agulhas Current, which can bring tropical and subtropical specimens normally resident thousands of kilometres away.

Great white shark
Cape fur seal
Cetaceans
Southern right whale
Humpback whale
Bryde's whale
Pygmy right whale
Heaviside's dolphin
Dusky dolphin
Indo-Pacific bottlenose dolphin
Indo-Pacific humpback dolphin
Long-beaked common dolphin
Killer whale (orca)
 African oystercatcher

Seaweeds 
Seaweeds are thousands of species of macroscopic, multicellular, marine algae of varied taxonomic classification. The term includes some types of Rhodophyta (red), Phaeophyta (brown) and Chlorophyta (green) macroalgae.

The seaweed ecology is unusually varied for an area of this size, as a result of the meeting of two major oceanic water masses near Cape Point, comprising two coastal marine bioregions. The ecology of the west or "Atlantic Seaboard" side of the Cape Peninsula is noticeably different in character and biodiversity to that of the east, or "False Bay" side. Both sides are classified as temperate waters, but there is a significant difference in average temperature, with the Atlantic side being noticeably colder on average.

Algal blooms 

False Bay has a high incidence of dinoflagellate blooms that may produce toxins or accumulate as red tides. The water retention and stratification of late summer and autumn produce the environment most conducive to harmful algal blooms. Algal blooms tend to propagate clockwise with the circulation, and may become trapped in the Gordon's Bay eddy for more extended periods.

Brown discoloration in the surf zone along the north shore is frequently due to persistent blooms of the non-toxic diatom Anaulus australis, which is provided with nutrients from groundwater seepage through the sand bottom and river outfalls containing waste water from the nearby sewage purification systems.

Marine protected areas

The Table Mountain National Park Marine Protected Area is an inshore marine protected area around the Cape Peninsula. It was proclaimed in Government Gazette No. 26431 of 4 June 2004 in terms of the Marine Living Resources Act, 18 of 1998. The MPA is of value for conservation of a wide range of endemic species, and has considerable economic value as a tourist destination. It encloses a large number of recreational dive sites visited by local residents and tourists from further afield. The shark and whale watching tourist industries are also represented, and there are several popular surf breaks. The MPA is mainly a controlled zone where extractive activities are allowed under permit, with six small no-take zones. The MPA is administrated by the Table Mountain National Park, a branch of SANParks.

The marine ecology is unusually varied for an area of this size, as a result of the meeting of two major oceanic water masses near Cape Point, and the park extends into two coastal marine bioregions. The ecology of the west or "Atlantic Seaboard" side of the park is noticeably different in character and biodiversity to that of the east, or "False Bay" side. Both sides are classified as temperate waters, but there is a significant difference in average temperature, with the Atlantic side being noticeably colder on average. This MPA contains culturally significant fish traps, historical wrecks and traditional fishing communities, and is also important for commercial fisheries. Part of the  West Coast rock lobster industry takes place within the MPA – as well as recreational and subsistence fishers, and an illegal poaching industry mostly targeting abalone, rock lobster and territorial linefish from the no-take zones.

The Helderberg Marine Protected Area is a small marine conservation area on the north-eastern side of False Bay between the mouths of the Lourens River in the Strand, and the Eerste River in Macassar. The Helderberg MPA is in the warm temperate Agulhas bioregion. The shoreline is sandy beach with mobile dunes, and the seabed is low sandstone reef with kelp beds and sand sediments. The areas nearest to the river mouths are in relatively poor condition due to pollution of the river water. The beach inside the MPA is the most pristine part of the north shore of False Bay.

Economic value 
The harbours and slipways support the South African Navy, a small fishing industry, and a larger recreational boating community, including yachts, recreationl fishing boats and recreational diving boats.

There are harbours at:
Simon's Town
Simon's Town naval base, with dry-dock and synchrolift facilities
False Bay Yacht Club (marina and club trailer and travelift slipways)
Kalk Bay (commercial fishing harbour, with rail slipway for repairs)
Gordon's Bay (commercial fishing harbour, yacht club marina, NSRI station 9, and public trailer and rail slipways)
Harbour Island marina (recreational boating marina and public trailer slipway)

Other slipways 
Buffels Bay (public trailer slipway inside the TMNP)
Miller's Point (public trailer slipway for recreational and commercial ski-boats}
Rumbly Bay (public trailer slipway for recreational ski-boats
Rooi-els (private trailer slipway for local ratepayers)

Extractive exploitation of resources 

The only current commercial fisheries remaining in False Bay are linefishing for pelagic snoek and yellowtail and demersal species hottentot, kob, white stumpnose, geelbek and roman, trapping of West Coast rock lobster, and beach-seine fishing (treknet). There are experimental fisheries such as for octopus, but this has been controversial due to entanglement of whales in the trap recovery lines. The demersal shark longline fishery also occasionally operates on the southeastern side of the bay.

Commercial line-fishing remains mostly hand-line fishing using baited lines. In the mid 1980s regulations and a licensing system were introduced. In the last decade of the 20th century linefish catches along the South African coast declined to the extent that emergency measures were declared to protect the remaining stock. Licensing systems were revised in an attempt to establish a sustainable commercial boat based fishery, restricted to 316 boats between Port Nolloth and Cape Infanta. Catch limits on most species apply, with the exception of snoek, which is now by far the largest part of reported catch. Catches have become relatively stable since the early 2000s, though white stumpnose have continued to decline.

Recreational fishing is the largest and most economically important fishery in the bay. It includes boat based angling and shore angling both from the rocky coast and from sandy beaches, and angling in estuaries, spearfishing and cast netting. In the first part of the 20th century most shore angling was for reef fish from the rocky east and west coasts of the bay, but a decline in the targeted species on the shoreline reefs and availability of four-wheel drive vehicles led to a move towards beach angling from the northern shore and targeting kob, white steenbras and slender bellman . Catches have declined and elasmobranchs are increasingly targeted by sports fishers. There has also been a move towards catch and release, and recent limitations on catch and closed areas in marine protected areas have slightly relieved the pressure, but stock of the top five target species have continued to diminish.

The beach-seine or treknet fishery has provided fish for over 300 years. For much of that time it has been in conflict with other fisheries, some of which have been discontinued. Before 1975 there were more than 100 licensed operators, but this number has been reduced and as of 2019 stands at only five. Despite claims that the fishery is detrimental to stocks, large quantities of juveniles and other bycatch are affected, and the nets damage the benthic ecosystem, an investigation found that the licence holders had a right to continue targeting traditional species and that the impacts on the ecosystem are insignificant. Traditional fishing communities account for a large part of the traditional line-fish, lobster, and beach-seine fisheries, as crew or rights-holders, or by illegal fishing. Snoek and harder are an important part of the informal trade system in the traditional fishing communities, and contribute towards local food security.

Chondrichthyans were traditionally a minor component of the catch or were often bycatch, but have recently become target of the demersal shark longline fishery, and are now more likely to be retained in other fisheries, which has led to concern whether the exploitation levels are sustainable.

The commercially important West Coast rock lobster fishery was historically concentrated on the west coast, but catches east of Cape Point have increased since 1990, partly due to eastward shift of the lobster population, and partly due to declines in the west coast stock due to over-exploitation and habitat degradation, but the portion caught in False Bay remains a small part of the total catch. The population has recovered slightly, but the long-term survival of the resource is compromised by extensive illegal fishing and excessive allocations by the authorities.

The abalone fishery was historically concentrated east of False Bay, and a high level of poaching and ecological side effects of the lobster population shift have caused severe reductions in the abalone stocks, which led to the commercial fishery being closed between 2008 and 2009. The recreational lobster fishery has been severely reduced and the recreational abalone fishery closed altogether since 2003.

Other invertebrates that are harvested in the bay under the permit system include mussels and clams, giant turban shells (alikreukel) and various limpets. Experimental fisheries have included whelks, crabs and octopus.

The sea bamboo kelp Ecklonia maxima is harvested as whole kelp, kelp fronds, and stranded drift, for use as feed for farmed abalone and as a plant growth stimulant, in quantities considered far below the sustainable yield. No other seaweeds are harvested commercially in False Bay.

All of False Bay, inside a line between the lighthouse at Cape Point and the lighthouse at Cape Hangklip is closed to trawling, purse seining, longlining and the use of lobster traps.

Recreational pursuits and tourism 

Fishing can be good in False Bay and at times there are large schools of snoek, an oily, barracuda-like fish that is much sought after locally, and Yellowtail. Angling from the rocky shores to either side of the bay is very popular, but can be dangerous. The shape of the seabed at the mouth of the bay creates interference patterns in the swells that come in from the Southern Ocean and these patterns occasionally combine to cause "killer waves" to rise up without obvious warning and to sweep the sandstone ledges well above the high tide mark. A number of rock anglers have been swept away and drowned over the years, but this seems to have done little to dampen enthusiasm for the sport.

Sailing is also a popular recreational activity in False Bay. The sailing clubs in False Bay include False Bay Yacht Club in Simon's Town, Fish Hoek Beach Sailing Club at the main beach in Fish Hoek, Gordon's Bay Yacht Club in the Gordon's Bay Harbour, and Hottentots Holland Beach Sailing Club in Strand. The moorings at the False Bay Yacht club are well protected from south easterly waves as they are in the lee of the naval base harbour, and are in the lee of the peninsula for westerly waves, and the water is relatively deep. The marina at Harbour Island in Gordon's Bay is protected against swells from all directions, but the entrance and inshore approaches are exposed to large south-westerly seas. Gordon's Bay harbour is largely silted up by sand, and access by keeled sailing yachts is limited by draught and tide.

There is a small granite island in the bay called Seal Island, which is one of the main breeding sites for the Cape fur seal. The seals attract many great white sharks and some of the biggest sharks ever seen have been spotted in these waters.  These sharks are famous for the manner in which they breach the surface of the water while attacking seals, sometimes jumping entirely out of the water. Despite this, swimming, surfing, sailing, scuba diving and freediving are popular pastimes around the bay, at centres such as Muizenberg, Kalk Bay, Smitswinkel Bay, Strand and Gordon's Bay. Shark attacks are uncommon but not unknown, with two deaths since 2010. Sightings of great white sharks have decreased in recent years; it is believed that competition between the sharks and a population of Orca in the region may be responsible.

Tourism relating to False Bay makes a significant contribution to the region's economy, providing revenue from whale watching, shark-cage diving and other water sports.

Beaches

Surfing 

False Bay is open to the south, and the prevailing open ocean swell arrives from the southwest, so the exposure varies considerably around the coastline. The inshore bathymetry near Cape Point is shallow enough for a moderate amount of refraction of long period swell, but deep enough to have less effect on short period swell, and acts as a filter to pass mainly the longer swell components to the Western shores, although they are significantly attenuated. The eastern shores get more of the open ocean spectrum, and this results in very different swell conditions between the two sides at any given time.

The fetch is generally too short for southeasterly winds to produce good surf.

List of named breaks in False Bay, clockwise from Cape Point to Hangklip:
 Buffels Bay: Right hand point break . Works in very large open ocean swell. Suddenly jacks and barrels along a shallow reef for about 200 m. 
 Black Rocks: Right-hand reef break, which also needs a large open ocean swell
 Glencairn: Left-hand break, which also needs a large open ocean swell
 Fish Hoek:
 Clovelly: A short left-hand reef break that works at low tide with a clean 0.9 to 1.2 m swell
 Kalk Bay Reef: Hollow left-hand reef break.  
 Kalk Bay Backdoor: Hollow right-hand reef break on the other side of Kalk Bay reef.  
 Danger Reef:
 St James:
 Bailey’s Reef: A short, hollow right-hand reef break. 
 Surfers’ Corner:
 Rivermouth:
 Sunrise: Beach break . 
 Cemetery:
 Nine Miles Reef:
 Monwabisi:
 Pipe:
 Bikini Beach: Left-hand point break off Gordon's Bay harbour wall. 
 Caves (Koeël Bay): Beach break on a shifting sandbar. Tends to close out.
 Koeël Bay Beach:
 Paranoia:
 Off the Mountain:
 Pringle Bay:
 Moonlight Bay:

Recreational scuba diving 

Most of the recreational dive sites of False Bay are in the Table Mountain National Park Marine Protected Area. A permit is required to scuba dive in any MPA in South Africa. These permits are valid for a year and are available at some branches of the Post Office. Temporary permits, valid for a month, may be available at dive shops or from dive boat operators who operate in an MPA. A personal recreational scuba diving permit is valid in all South African MPAs where recreational diving is allowed. The business permit to operate recreational scuba business operations in an MPA is restricted to a specific MPA. Diving for commercial or scientific purposes is also subject to permit.

Named dive sites 

False Bay has a large number of rocky reef and wreck recreational dive sites which have been identified by position and named. Many of these have been partly or completely surveyed, mapped and described in the travel guide for diving the Cape Peninsula and False Bay on Wikivoyage. Some of them are listed here for the west coast of the bay from north to south (within the TMNPMPA), for offshore parts of the bay, and for the east coast of the bay, also from north to south, roughly following the coastline where relevant:

 
False Bay west:

False Bay offshore:
Seal Island: , (shark cage diving)
Drop Zone:  
East shoal: 
Moddergat: 
York shoal: 
SAS Fleur wreck: 
Steenbras Deep North pinnacle: 
Steenbras Deep South pinnacle: 
SATS General Botha wreck: 
Blue Flame Pinnacles
SAS Bloemfontein wreck: 
Off-Whittle Ridge: 
Whittle Rock reefs:
Kelly's Anchor: 
Riaan and Sven's anchor: 
East Ridge North Pinnacle: 
North-west corner pinnacles: 
September anchor: 
Whittle Rock North-west Pinnacle: 
Euphrates anchors: ,  and 
Billy's anchor: 
JJ's anchor: 
Little anchor: 
Criss-cross Cracks: 
Whittle Rock West Pinnacle: 
Whittle Rock (Shallowest pinnacle): , about 8 km offshore
Whaleback Pinnacles: 
Whittle Rock Western Reef Pinnacle: , inside the TMNPMPA
Marc's anchor: 
Whittle Rock South-east Pinnacle: 
Whaleback Rock: 
South east pinnacle chain (Neptune's bath plug): 
Flash pinnacle: 
Georgina's anchor: 
M&M Tower (the Spark plug): 
Cave Complex reef: 
Bus Stop (the Gnarly wall): 
Wreckless Rock and the Little Labyrinth: 
Table Top pinnacle: 
Mossie's Cave and pinnacle: 
Grant's Spike (South-western pinnacles): 
Labyrinth: 
Labyrinth South Pinnacle: 
Deep South Pinnacle: 
Bruce's Mark 
Deep South Whittle Reef

False Bay east:
Bikini Beach: 
Ledges: 
Vogelsteen: 
Cow and Calf (Koei en Kalf): 
Stone Dog: 
Pinnacle: 
Lorry Bay: 
Phil's Bay: 
Noble Reef: 
Rocky Bay: 
Blousteen East: 
Blousteen: 
Blousteen Ridge: 
Whirlpool Cove: 
Percy's Hole Cave: 
Percy's Hole: 
Kruis (Crosses): 
Rooi-els Point: 
Coral Gardens, Rooi-els: 
Andre se Gat: 
Balcony: 
Ankers: 
Mike's Reef: 
Container Bay:

Naval base at Simon's Town 

The famous naval base of Simon's Town is in Simon's Bay, about halfway down the length of the False Bay coast of the Cape Peninsula. During the Second World War many heavy guns were mounted in concrete bunkers at various points along the mountainous shores of False Bay in order to deter attacks on Simon's Town. The firepower and defensive situation of these weapons were formidable and no attack was ever mounted. Although some of the guns were removed decades ago, a few large guns are still emplaced on the hillsides near the Redhill road. Lower North battery at the bottom of Redhill road is used for naval gunnery training and has a few examples of currently used weapon systems for this purpose.

Development and human impact 
Although urban development of the coast is intense along some parts of False Bay, much of the shoreline remains relatively wild and unspoiled. The bulk of the development is residential; there is little heavy industry. There are a few exceptions, however: one of the largest dynamite factories in the world used to lie near the beach in a sparsely inhabited region towards the eastern end of the bay. The nitroglycerine plant at this installation blew up twice in the second half of the 20th century and sent massive shockwaves across the bay, breaking windows and rattling walls on the distant shores. False Bay is poor in natural harbours. Almost all protection for shipping and smaller vessels has been created by extending the small naturally protected bays by artificial means (e.g. at Kalkbaai, Simon's Town and Gordon's Bay).

During the critical water shortage of the 2018 Cape Town water crisis two reverse osmosis desalination plants were installed at Strandfontein and Monwabisi resort on the north coast of the bay They were all operating by August 2018, but there have been problems and shutdowns since then due to algal blooms, a natural phenomenon quite common in the area. The locations were at least partly chosen for proximity to the suburbs of the Cape Flats, which could have been severely affected if the supply of piped water had failed.

The population of Cape Town has more than doubled since the 1980s, and pollution has followed suit. Over-fishing has caused major reductions in stock and catches of commercially and recreationally targeted fish and invertebrates, and poaching is widespread. A number of alien invasive species have spread into the bay.

The environmental impact of recreational diving in False Bay has not been studied, but is estimated to be low, partly due to the relatively resilient temperate subtidal reef ecosystems, and partly due to the relatively low numbers of divers visiting each site, as there are a large number of sites available for both shore and boat access.

Climate change
Winds that cause upwellings have increased, causing a cooling of the water in the bay, and possibly nutrient enrichment. The ecosystem has shifted as a result, with typical west coast species like kelp and rock lobsters expanding their ranges and populations eastwards. Sea level rise and exposure to more frequent storm surge has increased the erosion of low lying sandy shores, and increased risk to coastal developments.

The rising sea level is cutting back the coastline near Macassar beach during high swell events at a rate in the order of 2 m per year. The sea level is estimated to have been rising at about 1.9 mm per year since 1958.

Research
Early oceanographic and biological research in the region tended to be top-down sector based, but this trend has changed since the last decade of the 20th century to systems-orientated research for integrated coastal management and ecosystem based conservation. Recent research has included the effects of climate change, population growth, and related issues of over-fishing and coastal development.

On 25 September 1968, and again, 21 years later, on 11 and 12 September 1989, symposia on the environmental assessment of False Bay were held under the auspices of the Royal Society of South Africa in Cape Town.  The proceedings of both symposia were published as dedicated issues of the Transactions of the Royal Society of South Africa. Subsequently, in 1991, the Society published the proceedings of the 1989 symposium in book form.

A review paper published in August 2019 lists 310 relevant papers published on False Bay.

See also

References

External links

Multibeam sonar images of Whittle Rock and other reefs of False Bay

Geography of Cape Town
Bays of South Africa